Philodromus longipalpis is a spider species found in Europe, Iran and Azerbaijan.

See also 
 List of Philodromidae species

References

External links 

longipalpis
Spiders of Europe
Spiders of Asia
Fauna of Azerbaijan
Fauna of Iran
Spiders described in 1870